249 (two hundred [and] forty-nine) is the natural number following 248 and preceding 250.

Additionally, 249 is:
a Blum integer.
a semiprime.
palindromic in bases 82 (3382).
a Harshad number in bases 3, 83, 84, 124, 167 and 247.
the aliquot sum of any of these numbers: 375, 531, 1687, 4351, 7807, 12127, 14647 and 15151.
part of the 3-aliquot tree. The aliquot sequence starting at 288 is: 288, 531, 249, 87, 33, 15, 9, 4, 3, 1, 0.

References

Integers